Swarkestone Cricket Club is a cricket club based in Swarkestone, 5 miles south of Derby, and has a history dating back to the early 20th century.

Ground
The home ground is located at Barrow Turn in Swarkestone, Derbyshire and has 2 all-weather net facilities. The 1st and 2nd XI teams use Barrow Turn, rated by the DCCL as a Grade A+ ground, and the 3rd XI have access to the Aston-on-Trent Cricket Club ground off Shardlow Road, rated a Grade A ground.

History
The club originally played at Ingleby before locating to Swarkestone in the 1930s. By 1990, the club joined Derbyshire County Cricket League. The 1st XI team entered the Derbyshire Premier Division in 2012 and finished 2nd in the club's first ever year in the top flight of the Derbyshire League. Since then, the Club has won the Derbyshire County League Championship twice: 2013 & 2016.

See also
 Club cricket

References

External links
 Official play-cricket website

Cricket in Derbyshire
English club cricket teams
South Derbyshire District